The Ministry of Foreign Affairs (Ministerstwo Spraw Zagranicznych, MSZ) is the Polish government department tasked with maintaining Poland's international relations and coordinating its participation in international and regional supra-national political organisations such as the European Union and United Nations. The head of the ministry holds a place in the Council of Ministers.

Remit and responsibilities of the ministry
The Ministry of Foreign Affairs is responsible primarily for maintaining good, friendly relations between the Polish Republic and other states. In doing so it is required to act primarily as a representative of the Polish people. To this end all Polish diplomatic missions around the world are subordinate to the Ministry of Foreign Affairs. Ambassadors, whilst receiving their credentials from the President of Poland, are employees of the foreign ministry and are recommended to the President for their posts by the minister of foreign affairs.

The ministry is considered to be one of Poland's most important, with the minister of foreign affairs ranking amongst the most influential people in Polish politics. This position is typically reserved for seasoned, professional politicians, and is thought to require a great deal of tact and intellect.

History
The Ministry of Foreign Affairs was first established, with Leon Wasilewski as its secretary, under the authority of the Regency Council when Poland regained (albeit in name only) its independence from the occupying German forces in the First World War. However, the ministry began to fulfil its ascribed duties truly only after the fall of the Regency Council, adoption of the Treaty of Versailles and the rise to power of Józef Piłsudski. The ministry was then, until 1939, located in central Warsaw, with its seat in the Brühl Palace on Piłsudski Square. During the Second World War, the ministry was evacuated, along with the rest of the Polish government, first to France and then onwards to London, where it formed part of the Polish government in exile. During this period Count Edward Raczyński, a man who was later to become President of the government in exile, was the minister responsible. After 1945, when most countries began to afford diplomatic recognition to the new communist government in Warsaw, at the expense of the government in exile, the authorities of the new Polish People's Republic refounded the ministry and appointed, as its first minister, Edward Osóbka-Morawski.

Since 1989 and the establishment of the Third Republic, the ministry and its staff have been located in a complex of buildings on Aleje Szucha in central Warsaw, not far displaced from the Chancellery of the Prime Minister.

Structure

Regional affairs departments
The departments for regional affairs exist to monitor the internal situation and politics of the countries within the area of any one specific department's competence. They coordinate development of bilateral relations, initiate the related undertakings and prepare evaluations. These departments oversee the issue of Poland's participation in the structures of multilateral cooperation with any relevant partner states, as well as handling interregional cooperation. They are responsible for the substantive activity of relevant Polish diplomatic missions abroad.

Currently the Following regional affairs departments exist:

 Administration Office
 Asia-Pacific Department
 Bureau for the Protection of Classified Information
 Bureau of Archives and Information Management
 Bureau of Control and Audit
 Bureau of Finances
 Bureau of Human Resources
 Bureau of Infrastructure
 Department for Cooperation with Polish Diaspora and Poles Abroad
 Department for Proceedings before International Human Rights Protection Bodies
 Department of Africa and the Middle East
 Department of Consular Affairs
 Department of Development Cooperation
 Department of Economic Cooperation
 Department of European Union Law
 Department of Foreign Policy Strategy
 Department of Public and Cultural Diplomacy
 Department of the Americas
 Department of the Committee for European Affairs
 Department of United Nations and Human Rights
 Diplomatic Protocol
 Director General's Office
 Eastern Department
 EU Economic Department
 European Policy Department
 Information Technology and Telecommunication Office
 Inspectorate of the Foreign Service
 Legal and Treaty Department
 MFA Press Office
 Minister's Secretariat
 Operations Centre
 Political Director's Office
 Security Policy Department

Ministers of Foreign Affairs (since 1989) 

Political Party:

Previous officeholders
Kingdom of Poland (1917–1918)
 Wojciech Rostworowski (26 November 1917 – 27 February 1918) (Director of the Department of Political Affairs)
 Janusz Radziwiłł (4 April 1918 – 23 October 1918) (Director of the Department of State)
 Stanisław Głąbiński (23 October 1918 – 4 November 1918) (Minister for Outside Affairs)

Second Polish Republic
 Leon Wasilewski (17 November 1918 – 16 January 1919)
 Ignacy Jan Paderewski (16 January 1919 – 9 December 1919)
 Władysław Wróblewski (13 December 1919 – 16 December 1919)
 Stanisław Patek (16 December 1919 – 9 June 1920)
 Eustachy Sapieha (23 June 1920 – 24 May 1921)
 Jan Dąbski (24 May 1921 – 11 June 1921)
 Konstanty Skirmunt (11 June 1921 – 6 June 1922)
 Gabriel Narutowicz (18 June 1922 – 14 December 1922)
 Aleksander Skrzyński (16 December 1922 – 26 May 1923)
 Marian Seyda (28 May 1923 – 27 October 1923)
 Roman Dmowski (27 October 1923 – 14 December 1923)
 Karol Bertoni (19 December 1923 – 19 January 1924)
 Maurycy Zamoyski (19 January 1924 – 27 July 1924)
 Aleksander Skrzyński (27 July 1924 – 5 May 1926)
 Kajetan Dzierżykraj-Morawski (10 May 1926 – 15 May 1926)
 August Zaleski (15 May 1926 – 2 November 1932)
 Józef Beck (2 November 1932 – 30 September 1939)

Polish government-in-exile

The Polish government-in-exile had a wide international recognition until 1945, and limited to just few countries until the 1970s

 August Zaleski (30 September 1939 – 25 July 1941)
 Edward Raczyński (22 August 1941 – 14 July 1943)
 Tadeusz Romer (14 July 1943 – 24 November 1944)
 Adam Tarnowski (29 November 1944 – 10 February 1949)
 Mieczysław Sokołowski (7 April 1949 – 8 December 1953)
 Aleksander Zawisza (8 August 1955 – 11 June 1970)
 Jerzy Gawenda (20 July 1970 – 14 July 1972)
 Jan Starzewski (18 July 1972 – 15 December 1973)
 Bronisław Hełczyński (17 January 1974 – 15 July 1976)
 Zygmunt Zawadowski (5 August 1976 – 1 September 1979)
 Kazimierz Sabbat (1 September 1979 – 7 April 1986)
 Zygmunt Szkopiak (1986 – 20 December 1990)

Republic of Poland / Polish People's Republic
 Edward Osóbka-Morawski (21 July 1944 – 2 May 1945)
 Wincenty Rzymowski (2 May 1945 – 5 February 1947)
 Zygmunt Modzelewski (6 February 1947 – 20 March 1951)
 Stanisław Skrzeszewski (20 March 1951 – 27 April 1956)
 Adam Rapacki (27 April 1956 – 22 December 1968)
 Stefan Jędrychowski (22 December 1968 – 22 December 1971)
 Stefan Olszowski (22 December 1971 – 2 December 1976)
 Emil Wojtaszek (2 December 1976 – 24 August 1980)
 Józef Czyrek (24 August 1980 – 21 July 1982)
 Stefan Olszowski (21 July 1982 – 12 November 1985)
 Marian Orzechowski (12 November 1985 – 17 June 1988)
 Tadeusz Olechowski (17 June 1988 – 9 September 1989)

References

External links
Ministry of Foreign Affairs of the Republic of Poland
 Home Ministry in the version of the archive
 Polish diplomatic missions abroad
 Foreign missions in Poland
 Polish Ministry of Foreign Affairs at Google Cultural Institute

Foreign Affairs
Poland, Foreign Affairs
For
 
Poland
Foreign relations of Poland
Ministries established in 1916